Cañaveral de pasiones is a Mexican telenovela produced by Humberto Zurita and Christian Bach for Televisa, and broadcast by Canal de las Estrellas in 1996.

Daniela Castro, Juan Soler, Francisco Gattorno and Patricia Navidad star in the main roles.

Plot 
The story takes place in the town of San Benito, near the city of Xalapa, in the beautiful sugarcane fields of the state of Veracruz. Two prominent families live in the area: the Monteros, owners of La Aurora, one of the most important sugar mills in the region, and the Santos, owners of an extensive sugarcane plantation. In the past, Fausto Santos (Leonardo Daniel) and Amador Montero (César Évora) stopped being friends when their love for Margarita Faberman (Felicia Mercado) came between them. Margarita was a beautiful woman who came from Europe with her younger sister, Dinorah (Azela Robinson). Margarita chose Fausto, married him and had a daughter named Julia with him. For his part, Amador ended up marrying Josefina Rosales (Angélica Aragón), the sister of the town's parish priest, Father Refugio (Fernando Balzaretti). Amador and Josefina had a son named Pablo. However, Amador never loved Josefina, a difficult woman. Amador was unfaithful to Josefina and had an affair with a woman named Socorro (Elizabeth Dupeyrón), with whom he fathered a son. Through Josefina's intervention, Socorro fled the town and gave her son to Father Refugio. The child was named Juan de Dios.

Julia, Pablo and Juan de Dios are best friends, although it is clear that Julia likes Pablo better, and both Pablo and Juan de Dios compete for Julia’s attentions. For her part, Josefina has always been jealous of Margarita, whom she slanders constantly believing that Amador is unfaithful to her with Margarita. But Amador's lover is, in fact, Dinorah, Margarita's sister. The relationship between them escalates to the point that they plan to leave town together. The night they were both planning to escape, they were discovered by Margaita. She locks up Dinorah and then leaves to meet Amador in order to convince him to return with his family. Unfortunately, a strong storm breaks out in the town. Amador and Margarita suffer a serious accident when they returned to San Benito. Amador dies instantly, but Margarita survives a little longer, in time to say a few words to the only witness to the accident, Remedios (Josefina Echánove), the traditional healer of the town. But in addition to Remedios, there are other people who know the truth of the situation. They are Father Refugio (bound by the secret of confession) and Rufino Mendoza (Roberto Ballesteros), a trusted employee of Amador, a vile and unscrupulous man who takes advantage of the situation to blackmail Dinorah and extract favors from her, besides earning Josefina’s trust and serving as a vehicle to fulfill her evil plans.

Both Fausto and Josefina believe that their respective spouses had betrayed them. This lie is sustained by Dinorah, who takes advantage of this lie in order to cover up her guilt, sully the memory of her sister, and win the affection of her brother-in-law Fausto, whom she has always loved. Dinorah convinces a depressed Fausto to marry her. For her part, Josefina is dedicated to smearing the memory of Margarita and despising her daughter Julia, whom she considers the same as her mother. Knowing the affection between her son Pablo and Julia, she decides to separate them by sending Pablo to Mexico City with the Elizondo Family, their distant relatives.

Ten years later, Julia (Daniela Castro), has become a beautiful woman. Unfortunately, the whole town speaks ill of her because of Josefina's rumors. As if that were not enough, her father despises her because he sees his dead wife Margarita in their daughter, while enduring the hatred of her Aunt Dinorah, who also blames the death of the son she had with Fausto; the truth is that Dinorah's son was actually Amador’s. The only ones that support Julia are her best friend Mireya (Patricia Navidad) (Remedios' granddaughter), her nanny Prudencia (Alma Delfina) and her godparents Don Samuel Aldapa (Jorge Russek) and his wife Amalia (Maria Eugenia Ríos), who see Julia as a daughter. Additionally, Juan de Dios (Francisco Gattorno) deeply loves Julia. She rejects him, seeing him as a brother, as well as knowing the feelings Mireya is harboring towards him.

One night, Pablo (Juan Soler), returns to San Benito after his long absence. Pablo returns to the town with the intention of informing his mother of his future marriage with Gina Elizondo (Marisol Santacruz). However, reuniting with his native land and his old friends causes Pablo to feel bound to his land, especially after seeing Julia again and seeing the rebirth of the feelings they both had since childhood.

But the love story between Julia and Pablo faces many obstacles. The first is the hatred between their respective families, and the second, that terrible lie of the past that enveloped their parents and which both will have to discover.

Cast 

 Daniela Castro as Julia Santos Faberman
 Juan Soler as Pablo Montero Rosales
 Francisco Gattorno as Juan de Dios
 Patricia Navidad as Mireya
 Azela Robinson as Dinorah Faberman
 Roberto Ballesteros as Rufino Mendoza
 Angélica Aragón as Josefina Rosales vda. de Montero
 Leonardo Daniel as Fausto Santos
 Fernando Balzaretti as Father Refugio "Cuco" Rosales
 Alma Delfina as Prudencia Martínez
 César Évora as Amador Montero
 Felicia Mercado as Margarita Faberman de Santos
 Jorge Russek as Don Samuel Aldapa
 María Eugenia Ríos as Doña Amalia de Aldapa
 Josefina Echánove as Doña Remedios
 Elizabeth Dupeyrón as Socorro Carrasco
 Marisol Santacruz as Gina Elizondo
 Liza Willert as Carlota
 Tony Bravo as Rafael Elizondo
 Norma Lazareno as Hilda de Cisneros
 Gilberto Román as Dr. Alejandro Cisneros
 Rodrigo Abed as Guillermo Elizondo
 Aracely Arámbula as Leticia Cisneros
 Dacia Arcaráz as Rosario "Chayo" de Osuna
 Héctor Cruz as Vicente Osuna
 Josafat Luna as Leopoldo
 Roberto Miquel as Enrique Cisneros
 Carlos Navarro as Gildardo
 José Luis Avendaño as Benigno
 Rigoberto Carmona as Salvador
 Luis Gerardo Lucio Amaya as Juanito
 Raúl Ruiz ad Don Neto
 Leonardo Unda as Chema
 Zoraida Gómez as Julia Santos Faberman (child)
 Sebastián Zurita as Pablo Montero Rosales (child)
 Raúl Castellanos as Juan de Dios (child)
 Marisol Centeno as Mireya (child)

Awards and nominations

References

External links 

1996 telenovelas
1996 Mexican television series debuts
1996 Mexican television series endings
Mexican telenovelas
Spanish-language telenovelas
Televisa telenovelas